John E. Bercaw (born December 3, 1944) is an American chemist and Centennial Professor of Chemistry, Emeritus at the California Institute of Technology.

Early life and education
Born in Cincinnati, Ohio, Bercaw obtained his bachelor of science in 1967 from North Carolina State University and later his PhD from the University of Michigan in 1971 under the direction of Hans-Herbert Brintzinger, followed by postdoctoral research with Jack Halpern at the University of Chicago.

Career
He joined the faculty at the Caltech in 1972. Bercaw was elected a Fellow of the American Academy of Arts and Sciences in 1991.

He is a member of the National Academy of Sciences (elected 1990), and he has received several national awards from the American Chemical Society (see below).

His research interests are in synthetic, structural and mechanistic organotransition metal chemistry, including most recently catalysts for polymerization and trimerization of olefins and investigations of hydrocarbon hydroxylation; fundamental transformations and thermodynamics of organotransition metal chemistry; catalysts for hydrocarbon partial oxidation; catalysts for olefin trimerization and polymerization; homogeneous transformations of carbon monoxide and dihydrogen to fuels and chemicals.

Prof. Bercaw has greatly enhanced our understanding of the mechanisms of Ziegler-Natta (ZN) olefin polymerizations. This metal-catalyzed polymerization process is operated on a vast scale and produces, worldwide, over 200 billion pounds of polyolefins per year. Bercaw’s work has led to a fundamental understanding of the detailed mechanisms of chain growth in ZN polymerizations and the factors which control syndio- and isotacticities and the degree of comonomer incorporation in copolymerizations; these variables are critical in determining the physical properties of the resultant polymers and copolymers.

Commercial processes have been based on Bercaw’s discoveries. For example, new and superior ethylene/alpha-olefin copolymers are now industrially produced with titanium catalysts utilizing (η5- C5Me4)SiMe2NCMe3 and related ligands devised in Bercaw’s laboratories. These copolymers have proved to have superior properties. These types of systems have also allowed superior methods for production of ethylene/propylene and ethylene/propylene/diene elastomers.

Awards
Source:

References

External links
 Bercaw's profile at Caltech
 Bercaw Group at Caltech
 "John E. Bercaw", Scientific Commons

1944 births
21st-century American chemists
California Institute of Technology faculty
Fellows of the American Academy of Arts and Sciences
Living people
Educators from Cincinnati
University of Michigan alumni
Members of the United States National Academy of Sciences
Scientists from Cincinnati